A stellarium is a three-dimensional map of the stars, typically centered on Earth. They are common fixtures at planetariums, where they illustrate the local deep space out to perhaps 50 light years. Older examples were normally built using small colored balls or lights on support rods (painted black to make them less obvious),  but more recent examples use a variety of projection techniques instead.

External links

Planetarium projection